6-18-67 is a short quasi-documentary film by George Lucas regarding the making of the 1969 Columbia film Mackenna's Gold. This non-story non-character visual tone poem is made up of nature imagery, time-lapse photography, and the subtle sounds of the Arizona desert. Shooting was completed on June 18, 1967.

See also
 List of American films of 1969

References

External links
 

Short films directed by George Lucas
1969 short films
1969 films
1969 documentary films
American short documentary films
1960s short documentary films
Documentary films about films
Films shot in Arizona
Films without speech
1960s English-language films
1960s American films